Krasnozyorskoye is an urban locality (an urban-type settlement) in Krasnozyorsky District of Novosibirsk Oblast, Russia. Population:

Notable residents 

Aleksandr Laktionov (born 28 May 1986), football player and coach

References

Urban-type settlements in Novosibirsk Oblast